is a video game music composer who has contributed to such Sega titles as Fighting Vipers 2 (1998) and F-Zero GX (2003). He is perhaps best known for his work as the music director of the Yakuza series and its Judgment spin-off series. He is a member of H., a band composed of Sega sound designers.

Live performances
Shoji performed two songs from the Yakuza series at the 2008 Tokyo Game Show. Together with H., he performed several rock arrangements of Out Run and Fantasy Zone themes at music event in October 2008.

Works
All works listed below were composed by Shoji unless otherwise noted.

References

External links
Siliconera Interview with Hidenori Shoji

Japanese male musicians
Japanese musicians
Living people
Sega people
Video game composers
Year of birth missing (living people)